Lymphotoxin beta receptor (LTBR), also known as tumor necrosis factor receptor superfamily member 3 (TNFRSF3), is a cell surface receptor for lymphotoxin involved in apoptosis and cytokine release. It is a member of the tumor necrosis factor receptor superfamily.

Function

The protein encoded by this gene is a member of the tumor necrosis factor (TNF) family of receptors. It is expressed on the surface of most cell types, including cells of epithelial and myeloid lineages, but not on T and B lymphocytes. The protein specifically binds the lymphotoxin membrane form (a complex of lymphotoxin-alpha and lymphotoxin-beta). The encoded protein and its ligand play a role in the development and organization of lymphoid tissue and transformed cells. Activation of the encoded protein can trigger apoptosis.

Not only does the LTBR help trigger apoptosis, it can lead to the release of the cytokine interleukin 8.  Overexpression of LTBR in HEK293 cells increases IL-8 promoter activity and leads to IL-8 release.  LTBR is also essential for development and organization of the secondary lymphoid organs and chemokine release.

Structure
The Ramachandran plots show that 64.6% of all residues were in a favored region.
This structure was found using X-ray diffraction.  The resolution is 3.50 angstroms.
The alpha and beta angles are 90 degrees while the gamma angle is 120 degrees.

Interactions
Lymphotoxin beta receptor has been shown to interact with Diablo homolog and TRAF3.

References

Further reading

External links
 

TNF receptor family